Self-defense (self-defence primarily in Commonwealth English) is a countermeasure that involves defending the health and well-being of oneself from harm. The use of the right of self-defense as a legal justification for the use of force in times of danger is available in many jurisdictions.

Physical

Physical self-defense is the use of physical force to counter an immediate threat of violence. Such force can be either armed or unarmed. In either case, the chances of success depend on various parameters, related to the severity of the threat on one hand, but also on the mental and physical preparedness of the defender.

Unarmed

Many styles of martial arts are practiced for self-defense or include self-defense techniques. Some styles train primarily for self-defense, while other combat sports can be effectively applied for self-defense. Some martial arts train how to escape from a knife or gun situation or how to break away from a punch, while others train how to attack. To provide more practical self-defense, many modern martial arts schools now use a combination of martial arts styles and techniques, and will often customize self-defense training to suit individual participants.

Armed

A wide variety of weapons can be deployed for use in a defensive capacity. The most suitable depends on the threat presented, the victim or victims, and the experience of the defender. Legal restrictions also vary greatly, and influence which self-defense options are available to choose from. 

Some jurisdictions firearms may be carried openly or concealed expressly for this purpose, many jurisdictions have tight restrictions on who can own firearms, and what types they can own. Knives, especially those categorized as switchblades, may also be controlled, as may batons, pepper spray and personal stun guns and Tasers—although some may be legal to carry with a license or for certain professions.

Non-injurious water-based self-defense indelible dye-marker sprays, or ID-marker or DNA-marker sprays linking a suspect to a crime scene, would in most places be legal to own and carry.

Everyday objects, such as flashlights, baseball bats, newspapers, keyrings with keys, kitchen utensils and other tools, and hair spray aerosol cans in combination with a lighter, can also be used as improvised weapons for self-defense.

Verbal self-defense 

Verbal self-defense is defined as using words "to prevent, de-escalate, or end an attempted assault."

Women's self-defense

According to Victims of Sexual Violence: Statistics on Rainn, about "80 percent of juvenile victims were female and 90 percent of rape victims were adult women". In addition, women from ages 18 to 34 are highly at risk to experience sexual assault. According to historian Wendy Rouse in Her Own Hero: The Origins of Women's Self-Defense Movement, women's self-defense training emerged in the early twentieth century in the United States and the United Kingdom paralleling the women's rights and suffrage movement. These early feminists sought to raise awareness about the sexual harassment and violence that women faced on the street, at work, and in the home. They challenged the notion that men were their "natural protectors" noting that men were often the perpetrators of violence against women. Women discovered a sense of physical and personal empowerment through training in boxing and jiu-jitsu. Interest in women's self-defense paralleled subsequent waves of the women's rights movement especially with the rise of Second-wave feminism in the 1960s and 1970s and Third-wave feminism in the 1990s. Today's Empowerment Self-Defense (ESD) courses focus on teaching verbal and psychological as well as physical self-defense strategies. ESD courses explore the multiple sources of gender-based violence especially including its connections with sexism, racism, and classism. Empowerment Self-Defense instructors focus on holding perpetrators responsible while empowering women with the idea that they have both the right and ability to protect themselves.

Self-defense education

Self-defense techniques and recommended behavior under the threat of violence is systematically taught in self-defense classes. Commercial self-defense education is part of the martial arts industry in the wider sense, and many martial arts instructors also give self-defense classes. While all martial arts training can be argued to have some self-defense applications, self-defense courses are marketed explicitly as being oriented towards effectiveness and optimized towards situations as they occur in the real world. Many systems are taught commercially, many tailored to the needs of specific target audiences (e.g. defense against attempted rape for women, self-defense for children and teens). Notable systems taught commercially include:

 Civilian versions of modern military combatives, such as Krav Maga, Defendo, Spear, Systema
 Japanese Armed & Unarmed Combat Art Systems directly taught as Combatives with No Sport Aspect, also adapted to modern weapons such as Bujinkan
Jujutsu and arts derived from it, such as Aikijujutsu, Aikido, Bartitsu, German ju-jutsu, Kodokan Goshin Jutsu,  Yamabujin Goshin-Jutsu.
 Model Mugging
 Traditional unarmed fighting styles like Karate, Kung fu, Hapkido, Pencak Silat, Taekkyon, etc. These styles can also include competing.
 Traditional armed fighting styles like Kali/Eskrima/Arnis. These include competing, as well as armed and unarmed combats.
 Street Fighting oriented, unarmed systems, such as Jeet Kune Do, Kajukenbo, Won Sung Do ®, and Keysi Fighting Method
 Martial sports, such as boxing, kickboxing, Muay Thai, savate, shoot boxing, Sanshou, Taekwondo, judo, Brazilian jiu-jitsu, Sambo, and wrestling.

Legal aspects

Application of the law

In any given case, it can be difficult to evaluate whether force was excessive. Allowances for great force may be hard to reconcile with human rights.

The Intermediate People's Court of Foshan, People's Republic of China in a 2009 case ruled the killing of a robber during his escape attempt to be justifiable self-defense because "the robbery was still in progress" at this time.

In the United States between 2008 and 2012, approximately 1 out of every 38 gun-related deaths (which includes murders, suicides, and accidental deaths) was a justifiable killing, according to the Violence Policy Center.

In Canada, self-defence, in the context of criminal law, is a statutory defence that provides a full defence to the commission of a criminal act. It operates as a justification, the successful application of which means that owing to the circumstances in which the act was produced, it is not morally blameworthy. There are three elements an accused must demonstrate to successfully raise self-defence.

First, the accused must demonstrate that she or he believed on reasonable grounds that force was going to be used against her or him or another person or that a threat of force is being made against her or him or another person. The reasonableness of the belief is assessed through both a subjective and objective lens. Certain beliefs, including racist beliefs and beliefs induced by self-intoxication are prima facie unreasonable. Other beliefs related to the subjective experience of the accused may, however, be reasonable. These include any relevant military training (R v Khill), heightened awareness of patterns of cyclical violence in intimate relationships (R v Lavallée) and whether the accused has autism (R v Kagan).

Second, the act that constitutes the offence is committed for the purpose of defending or protecting themselves or the other person from that use or threat of force.

Third, the act that constitutes the offence must have been reasonable in the circumstances. There are a number of indicia which factor into whether the act was reasonable in the circumstances. For one, was the violence or threat of violence imminent? Usually, if there is a significant time interval between the original unlawful assault and the accused's response, it undermines the contention that there were no other means available to respond to the potential use of force and one tends to suspect that the accused was motivated by revenge rather than self-defence. However, R v Lavalleé accepted expert evidence demonstrating that people experiencing battered women's syndrome have special knowledge about the cyclical nature of violence in a way allows them to foresee when harm is coming. Second, it's relevant whether there was a reasonable avenue of escape available to the accused. Under the old self-defence provision, there was a requirement for the accused to have believed on reasonable grounds that there was no alternative course of action open to him at the time, so that he reasonably thought that he was obliged to kill in order to preserve himself from death or grievous bodily harm. Now, even though 34(2)(b) is only one consideration in a non-exhaustive list, the mandatory role it used to play in the common law suggests it carries considerable weight in determining the reasonableness of the act in the circumstances under 34(1)(c) 
As such, while there is no absolute duty to retreat, it is a prerequisite to the defence that there were no other legal means of responding available. In other words, there may be an obligation to do retreat where there is an option to do so (R v Cain). However, there is an exception to the obligation to retreat which is there is no requirement to flee from your own home to escape an assault to raise self-defence (R v Forde). Moreover, evidence of the accused suffering from battered women's syndrome may evince that the accused reasonably perceived there to have been no means of escape (R v Lavalleé). Third, the accused's role in the incident may play into the reasonableness of her or his act. Consideration of the accused's role is not limited to whether he did any provocative or unlawful acts at it was under the old self-defence provisions (R v Khill). Fourth, the nature and proportionality of the accused's response will factor into whether it was reasonable. While a person is not expected to weigh to a nicety the measure of force used to respond to violence or a threat thereof, grossly disproportionate force will tend to be unreasonable (R v Kong).

See also

Armed self-defense

 Airgun
 Ballistic knife
 Baton (law enforcement) / Tonfa (martial arts)
 Boot knife
 Brass knuckles
 Club (weapon)
 Crossbow
 CS gas
 Defense wound
 Defensive gun use
 Electroshock weapon
 Gun safety
 Handgun
 Hiatt speedcuffs
 Hollow-point bullet
 Knife / Combat knife
 Laser pointer
 Laser sight
 Mace (spray)
 Millwall brick
 Nunchuku
 Offensive weapon
 Paintball gun
 PAVA spray
 Pepper spray
 Personal defense weapon
 Riot shotgun
 Self-defense in international law
 Slapjack (weapon)
 Slingshot
 Stun grenade
 Switchblade
 Taser
 Throwing knife
 Tranquilizer gun
 Weighted-knuckle glove
 kubaton

Unarmed self-defense

 Anti-theft system
 Armored car
 Body armor
 Bodyguard
 Cyber self-defense
 Digital self-defense
 Door security
 Gated community
 GPS tracking unit
 Guard dog
 Hand to hand combat
 Intrusion alarm
 Peroneal strike
 Personal alarms
 Physical security
 Safe room
 Secure telephone
 Video surveillance systems

Legal and moral aspects

 Battered woman defense
 Castle doctrine
 Concealed carry
 Constitutional carry
 Duty to retreat
 Gun-free zone
 Gun laws in the United States (by state)
 Gun politics
 Gun politics in the United States
 Justifiable homicide
 Non-aggression principle
 Open Carry
 Reasonable force
 Self-defense in international law
 Self-preservation
 Sell your cloak and buy a sword
 Stand-your-ground law
 Use of force
 Turning the other cheek

References

External links